Bruno Leonardo dos Santos Covas (born 2 June 1996), known as Bruno Leonardo, is a Brazilian footballer who plays as a central defender for Portuguesa.

Club career
Born in Ribeirão Preto, São Paulo, Bruno Leonardo started his career at Comercial-SP's youth categories. He subsequently represented Olé Brasil, Velo Clube and Bahia before joining Santos in 2013.

On 12 February 2016, Bruno Leonardo renewed his contract with Peixe until the end of the year. He left the club in March 2018, and signed for Portuguesa Santista.

On 4 March 2020, however, after being only an unused substitute, he returned to his native state after signing for São Bento.

On 1 June 2021, Bruno Leonardo was announced as the new addition of Ferroviária. He moved to Paysandu on 8 April 2022, and despite featuring regularly, he terminated his contract on a mutual agreement on 10 August.

On 12 August 2022, Bruno Leonardo signed for Portuguesa.

Career statistics

References

External links

1996 births
Living people
People from Ribeirão Preto
Brazilian footballers
Association football defenders
Campeonato Brasileiro Série C players
Campeonato Brasileiro Série D players
Santos FC players
Associação Atlética Portuguesa (Santos) players
Esporte Clube São Bento players
Footballers from São Paulo (state)
Associação Ferroviária de Esportes players
Paysandu Sport Club players
Associação Portuguesa de Desportos players